Rădești is a commune in Galați County, Western Moldavia, Romania with a population of 1,490 people (2011). It is composed of two villages, Cruceanu and Rădești. These were part of Bălăbănești Commune until 2004, when they were split off.

References

Communes in Galați County
Localities in Western Moldavia